Nam Pi is a watercourse in the province of Phayao and Nan, Thailand. It is a tributary of the Yom River, part of the Chao Phraya River basin.

Pi